Samuel "Sam" Vincent Khouth is a Canadian voice actor working for Ocean Productions. He is best known for his roles as Krypto in Krypto the Superdog, Edd "Double D" in Ed, Edd n Eddy, Lloyd Garmadon in Ninjago, Jerry Mouse in Tom and Jerry Tales, Bugs Bunny, Daffy Duck & Tweety in Baby Looney Tunes, and Jordan C. Wilde in Ōban Star-Racers. He is also known for portraying Dr. Maurice in the 2005 sitcom, Hot Properties.

Career
Vincent's notable roles in English dubs of anime include Athrun Zala in Mobile Suit Gundam SEED and its sequel Mobile Suit Gundam SEED Destiny, Hikaru Shindo in Hikaru no Go, Julian Star in Cardcaptors, and Tieria Erde in Mobile Suit Gundam 00.

Other roles include Edd "Double D" in Ed, Edd n Eddy; Martin and Billy in Martin Mystery; Forge in X-Men: Evolution; Baby Bugs, Baby Tweety, and Baby Daffy in Baby Looney Tunes; Sideswipe in Transformers: Armada; the titular character in Krypto the Superdog; Smiling Finn in The Deep; Eli Shane in Slugterra; Russell Ferguson in Littlest Pet Shop, and Aerrow and Dark Ace in Storm Hawks. Since 2018, Vincent has been the voice of Lloyd Garmadon in Ninjago and Chris Quantum from Superbook. He portrayed Dr. Maurice in the 2005 sitcom, Hot Properties.

In 2020, Vincent starred in the film Torn: Dark Bullets as Captain Jason Pearce, and in the web series Life of Gabe as his brother Gabe Khouth, who died in a motorcycle accident in 2019.

Filmography

Television

Film

Video games

Live-action

References

Bibliography

External links

Living people
Canadian male video game actors
Canadian male voice actors
Canadian voice directors
Year of birth missing (living people)
20th-century Canadian male actors
21st-century Canadian male actors